Karine Jean-Pierre (born August 13, 1974) is a Martinican-born American political advisor who has served as the White House press secretary since May 13, 2022. She is the first Black person and the first openly LGBT person to serve in the position. Previously, she served as the deputy press secretary to her predecessor Jen Psaki from 2021 to 2022 and as the chief of staff for U.S. Vice Presidential candidate Kamala Harris during the 2020 presidential campaign.

Prior to her work with Kamala Harris during the 2020 election and with the Biden–Harris administration, Jean-Pierre was the senior advisor and national spokeswoman for the progressive advocacy group MoveOn.org. She was also previously a political analyst for NBC News and MSNBC and a lecturer in international and public affairs at Columbia University.

Early life and education
Jean-Pierre was born in Fort-de-France, Martinique, France, the daughter of Haitian parents. She has two younger siblings, and was age five when her family relocated to Queens Village, a neighborhood in Queens, New York City. Her mother worked as a home health aide and was active in her Pentecostal church, while her father was a taxi driver, who had trained as an engineer.  Jean-Pierre was often responsible for caring for her (eight and ten years younger) siblings because both parents worked six or seven days per week.

In her memoir, Jean-Pierre describes how seeing former Congresswoman Barbara Jordan give a keynote speech at the 1992 Democratic National Convention altered the direction of her life and career: "She was the first Black woman in politics I had ever witnessed. In a world of pretty, pearl-wearing charmers, Jordan was substantive and authentic."

Jean-Pierre graduated from Kellenberg Memorial High School, a college-preparatory school on Long Island, in 1993. Her parents wanted her to study medicine, and she studied life sciences at the New York Institute of Technology as a commuter student, but performed poorly on the Medical College Admission Test. Changing career tracks, she earned a bachelor's degree from the New York Institute of Technology in 1997. She earned a Master of Public Affairs from the School of International and Public Affairs (SIPA), Columbia University, in 2003, where she served in student government and decided to pursue politics. At Columbia University, one of her mentors was Ester Fuchs, whose class she attended during the Fall 2001 semester.

She is fluent in English, French, and Haitian Creole.

Career

Early career
Following graduate school, Jean-Pierre worked as the director of legislative and budget affairs for New York City councilor James F. Gennaro. In 2006, she was hired as the outreach coordinator for Walmart Watch in Washington, D.C. She was the southeast regional political director for the John Edwards presidential campaign in 2004. She joined the Columbia University faculty in 2014, where she is a lecturer in international and public affairs.

Obama administration

During the Barack Obama 2008 presidential campaign, Jean-Pierre was the campaign's southeast regional political director and was the regional political director for the White House Office of Political Affairs during the Obama administration's first term.

In 2011, Jean-Pierre served as National Deputy Battleground States Director for President Obama's 2012 re-election campaign. She led the delegate selection and ballot access process and managed the political engagement in key states, providing resources to help states determine "the best way for them to get the word out for the campaign."

Jean-Pierre served as the deputy campaign manager for the Martin O'Malley 2016 presidential campaign.

MoveOn and political commentary
In April 2016, MoveOn named Jean-Pierre as a senior advisor and national spokesperson for the 2016 presidential election. MoveOn said she would "advise on and serve as a spokesperson around MoveOn's electoral work, including a major effort to stand up to Donald Trump."

In January 2019, Jean-Pierre became a political analyst for NBC News and MSNBC.

Jean-Pierre has worked at the Center for Community and Corporate Ethics. In December 2018, The Haitian Times named her one of six "Haitian Newsmakers Of The Year".

Biden administration

Jean-Pierre worked as a senior advisor to the Joe Biden 2020 presidential campaign. She joined the Biden team in May 2020, and explained to The Haitian Times that a desire to shape the future was especially motivating; she said that when she was approached by the campaign, she looked at her daughter and thought, "There is no way I can not get involved in this election." In August, it was announced that Jean-Pierre would serve as the Chief of Staff for Biden's vice presidential nominee, who had not yet been announced.

On November 29, 2020, the Biden-Harris transition team announced that Jean-Pierre had been made Principal Deputy Press Secretary. On May 26, 2021, she gave her first White House press briefing, becoming the first openly LGBTQ person to do so and the first Black woman to do so since 1991. 

On May 5, 2022, it was announced that she would succeed Jen Psaki as White House Press Secretary on May 13. She is the first Black person and the first openly LGBTQ person to hold the position.

Personal life
Jean-Pierre lives in the Washington, D.C., metropolitan area with her partner, CNN correspondent Suzanne Malveaux, and their daughter.

Jean-Pierre's book, Moving Forward: A Story of Hope, Hard Work, and the Promise of America, was published in 2019. She reviews her life and encourages people to become involved in politics. It was described by WJLA-TV as "part memoir, part call to arms".

Book

See also
Organizing for America

References

Notes

External links

1977 births
Living people
21st-century American memoirists
21st-century American women writers
21st-century American LGBT people
Activists from New York City
American women memoirists
American political consultants
American people of Haitian descent
American women in politics
Barack Obama 2008 presidential campaign
Barack Obama 2012 presidential campaign
Columbia University faculty
French emigrants to the United States
Joe Biden 2020 presidential campaign
Lesbian academics
LGBT appointed officials in the United States
French lesbians
American lesbians
LGBT people from New York (state)
MSNBC people
New York (state) Democrats
New York Institute of Technology alumni
People from Fort-de-France
School of International and Public Affairs, Columbia University alumni
White House Press Secretaries
Writers from Queens, New York